Sharon Lodge No. 28 IOOF is a historic Independent Order of Odd Fellows clubhouse located at Parkersburg, Wood County, West Virginia.  It was designed and built in 1897, by noted West Virginia architect H. Rus Warne (1872-1954).  It is a five-story, masonry building in an eclectic Romanesque Revival style. It features a deep Chateauesque hip roof, fronted by two stepped gable parapets.

It was listed on the National Register of Historic Places in 1982.

References

Cultural infrastructure completed in 1897
Buildings and structures in Parkersburg, West Virginia
Clubhouses on the National Register of Historic Places in West Virginia
H. Rus Warne buildings
Odd Fellows buildings in West Virginia
Romanesque Revival architecture in West Virginia
National Register of Historic Places in Wood County, West Virginia